Gilbert McNaughton Ormond (12 September 1933 – 2010) was a Scottish footballer who played as a left winger for Airdrieonians, Dundee United, Cowdenbeath and Alloa Athletic in the Scottish Football League.

Ormond joined Dundee United from Airdrieonians in February 1960, scoring on his debut against Albion Rovers. He was an ever-present in the team for the rest of the season as United won promotion from Division Two. After promotion to the top division, Ormond played regularly during the 1960–61 season, missing only four matches, but featured less often the following season after United signed Neil Mochan. He was released in May 1962 and joined Cowdenbeath.

In April 1960, Ormond was chosen to play for a Second Division Select against the Scotland under-23 team in an international trial match at Brockville Park in Falkirk, missing a penalty in a 3–1 defeat.

He was the younger brother of Scotland player and manager Willie Ormond. Another brother, Bert Ormond, emigrated and represented New Zealand at international level in 1962.

References

External links
 

1933 births
2010 deaths
Date of death missing
Footballers from Falkirk
Association football wingers
Scottish footballers
Scottish Football League players
Scottish Football League representative players
Airdrieonians F.C. (1878) players
Dundee United F.C. players
Cowdenbeath F.C. players
Alloa Athletic F.C. players
Falkirk F.C. non-playing staff
Kilsyth Rangers F.C. players
Scottish Junior Football Association players